The ocellated lizard or jewelled lizard (Timon lepidus) is a species of lizard in the family Lacertidae (wall lizards). The species is endemic to southwestern Europe.

Common names
Additional common names for T. lepidus include eyed lizard, and jeweled lacerta (in the pet trade),

Description
Timon lepidus is one of the largest members of its family. About two-thirds of its length is tail.

This is a robust lizard with a serrated collar. The male has a characteristic broad head. It has thick, strong legs, with long, curved claws. The dorsal background colour is usually green, but sometimes grey or brownish, especially on the head and tail. This is overlaid with black stippling that may form a bold pattern of interconnected rosettes. The underside is yellowish or greenish with both the male and female sporting bright blue spots along the flanks, though the male is typically brighter in colour than the female. Young are green, grey, or brown, with yellowish or white, often black-edged, spots all over.

Geographic range
Timon lepidus is native to southwestern Europe. It is found throughout the Iberian peninsula (Spain, Portugal, Gibraltar), and is patchily distributed in southern France and extreme northwestern Italy. The range for each subspecies is: 
Timon lepidus ibericus - northwestern Iberian Peninsula (Spain and Portugal)
Timon lepidus lepidus
Timon lepidus oteroi

Ecology
It is rare at higher altitudes. It prefers dry, bushy areas, such as open woodland and scrub, old olive groves and vineyards, and is sometimes found on more open, rocky or sandy areas. It can occasionally be seen basking on roadsides. The lizard usually stays on the ground, but climbs well on rocks and in trees. It can dig holes and sometimes uses abandoned rabbit burrows.

Diet
Timon lepidus feeds mainly on large insects, especially beetles, and snails, and also robs birds’ nests and occasionally takes reptiles, frogs, and small mammals. It also eats fruit and other plant matter, especially in dry areas.

Reproduction
Breeding in T. lepidus occurs in late spring or early summer. Males are territorial in spring and fight in the breeding season. The female lays up to 22 eggs in June and July about three months after mating, hiding them under stones and logs or in leaf litter or in loose damp soil. It tends to lay fewer, larger eggs in dry areas. The eggs hatch in eight to 14 weeks. The lizard is sexually mature at two years of age.

Conservation
Timon lepidus was listed as near threatened on The IUCN Red List of Threatened Species.  the species has been under protection in Spain; capture and trade is forbidden.

Gastronomy
The ocellated lizard was part of the traditional cuisine of Extremadura, Spain. In this region, the lizard was usually prepared in guisado, made by frying slices of lizard in olive oil, after which they were stewed over a slow fire.

References

External links

Ocellated  lizard SRS.EMBL-Heidelberg
Alles über die Art und der Haltung der wunderschönen Perleidechse! (All about keeping and breeding of the beautiful ocellated lizard!). (in German).
Photos at www.herp.it
Information about the ocellated lizard

Further reading
Arnold EN, Burton JA (1978). A Field Guide to the Reptiles and Amphibians of Britain and Europe. (Illustrated by D.W. Ovenden). London: Collins. 272 pp. + Plates 1-40. . (Lacerta lepida, pp. 130-131 + Plates 20, 22 + Map 65).
Boulenger GA (1887). Catalogue of the Lizards in the British Museum (Natural History). Second Edition. Volume III. Lacertidæ ... London: Trustees of the British Museum (Natural History). (Taylor and Francis, printers). xii + 575 pp. + Plates I-XL. (Lacerta ocellata, pp. 12-13).
Daudin FM (1802). Histoire Naturelle, Générale et Particulière des Reptiles; Ouvrage faisant suite à l'Histoire Naturelle générale et particulière, composée par Leclerc de Buffon; et rédigée par C.S. Sonnini, membre de plusieurs sociétés savantes. Tome troisième [Volume 3]. Paris: F. Dufart. 452 pp. (Lacerta lepida, new species, p. 204). (in French and Latin).
Duméril AMC, Bibron G (1839). Erpétologie générale ou Histoire naturelle complète des Reptiles. Tome cinquième [Volume 5]. Paris: Roret. viii + 854 pp. (Lacerta ocellata, pp. 218-225). (in French).
Goin CJ, Goin OB, Zug GR (1978). Introduction to Herpetology, Third Edition. San Francisco: W.H. Freeman. xi + 378 pp. . (Lacerta lepida, p. 300).
Mayer, Werner; Bischoff, Wolfgang (1996). "Beiträge zur taxonomischen Revision der Gattung Lacerta (Reptilia: Lacertidae). Tiel 1: Zootoca, Omanosaura, Timon und Teira als eigenständige Gattungen [Contributions to the taxonomic revision of the genus Lacerta (Reptilia: Lacertidae). Part 1: Zootoca, Omanosaura, Timon and Teira as full genera]". Salamandra 32 (3): 163-170. (Timon lepidus, new combination, p. 169). (in German, with an abstract in English).

Lizards of Europe
Reptiles described in 1802
Timon (genus)
Taxa named by François Marie Daudin